Sadkowa Góra  is a village in the administrative district of Gmina Borowa, within Mielec County, Subcarpathian Voivodeship, in south-eastern Poland.

The village has an approximate population of 890.

References

Villages in Mielec County